The Notebook of William Blake (also known as the Rossetti Manuscript from its association with its former owner Dante Gabriel Rossetti) was used by William Blake as a commonplace book from  (or 1793) to 1818.

Description
The Notebook [Butlin #201] consists of 58 leaves and contains autograph drafts by Blake of poems and prose with numerous sketches and designs, mostly in pencil. Containing two pages of preface, alongside 94 pages of sketches, each page is approximately 159 x 197mm. The original leaves were later bound with a partial copy (ff. 62–94) of 'All that is of any value in the foregoing pages' that is Rossettis' transcription of Blake's notebook (added after 1847).

Ideas of Good & Evil 
At first the Notebook belonged to Blake's favourite younger brother and pupil Robert who made a few pencil sketches and ink-and-wash drawings in it. After death of Robert in February 1787, Blake inherited the volume beginning it with the series of sketches for many emblematic designs on a theme of life of a man from his birth to death. He continued the book in 1800s returning to the first pages. All together the Notebook contains about 170 poems plus fragments of prose: Memoranda (1807), Draft for Prospectus of the Engraving of Chaucer's Canterbury Pilgrims (1809), Public Address (1810), A Vision of the Last Judgment (1810). The latest work in the Notebook is a long and elaborated but unfinished poem The Everlasting Gospel dated c. 1818.

On the page 4 is placed a short humorous poem "When a Man has Married a Wife..." and a picture above showing of a man and woman rising from bed in a sparsely furnished room that could be Blake's own. The line of text obscured by the picture "Ideas of Good & Evil" served probably as a title to 64 following picture emblems, 17 of which were used for the book "For Children: The Gates of Paradise". D. G. Rossetti, A. C. Swinburne, and W. B. Yeats in their publications of Blake's poetry used this as a title for the series of poems from the manuscripts. In 1905 John Sampson issued the first annotated publication of all these poems and created a detailed descriptive Index to 'The Rossettt MS.'. It follows by some other scholarly publications edited by Geoffrey Keynes (1935 & 1957/66), David V. Erdman (1965/82/88) & together with D. K. Moore (1977), Alicia Ostriker (1977), Gerald E. Bentley Jr. (1977), etc.

In the introduction of his publication D. G. Rossetti gave to these poems a following presentation:

Poems of 1793
The section of  contains 63 poems that include drafts versions of 16 poems entered the collection of Songs of Experience, which have been placed here in the following order:

Some of these drafts are significantly different from their last versions, for example "Infant Sorrow" of the Notebook is much more expanded and composed of nine quatrains instead of two that were chosen for the Songs of Experience. Also it is interesting to compare the most famous Blake's poem "The Tyger" with its two earlier Notebook versions (see: "The Tyger", 1st draft and 2nd draft).

The genre of most of the poems of this section can be defined as Songs and Ballads. Some of them reflect the political and social climate of that time:

✶✶✶

✶✶✶

Some other of these poems rather belong to the genre of Satiric verses and epigrams, like the following:

Motto to the Songs of Innocence and of Experience

This motto, which was never engraved by Blake, is not found in any copy of the Songs of Innocence and of Experience.

Poems of 1800–1803

There are 10 poems in the Notebook written during Blake's life in Felpham, a village in West Sussex. Here is the one of his most characteristic poems of that period:

✶✶✶

Poems of 1808–1811
The most of 92 texts of this section are epigrams, gnomic verses or fragments addressed to Blake's friends and enemies, to painters and poets as well as some different historical or mythological characters and even to God. Here are typical examples:

 ✶✶✶ 

 To God 

In the following short fragment Blake speaks of himself and his own spiritual experience in his babyhood:

✶✶✶

There is also a draft of famous Blake's motto from his poem Jerusalem The Emanation of the Giant Albion:

✶✶✶

But there in "Jerusalem" at the beginning of the chapter 4 ("To the Christians") it is given in a combination with other 4 mysterious lines:

Designs
The Notebook is full of Blake's sketches and designs almost on every page. Here is the index of the first 25 pages (see illustrations below):

... and so on.

These sketches often serve as the sources for Blake's later works, illustrations of his books, engravings, watercolors, etc. Here are some examples:

Owners

The volume was presented by Catherine Blake (Blake's widow) in 1827 to William Palmer, brother of Blake's pupil, Samuel Palmer. It was bought from him by Dante Gabriel Rossetti 30 April 1847. Later it was purchased by F. S. Ellis (at Rossetti's sale, T. G. Wharton, Martin & Co., 5 July 1882, lot 487) and by Ellis and Scruton (at Ellis's sale, Sotheby's, 18 Nov 1885, lot 608). Sold by Dodd, Mead and Co. of New York (f. ib) to William Augustus White (d. 1928) of Brooklyn, 26 Jan 1887. Inherited by his daughter, Mrs Frances Hillard Emerson (d. 1957) of Cambridge, Massachusetts. Presented by Mrs F. H. Emerson. Now in the possession of British Library: Add MS 49460.

See also
 Never pain to tell thy love

Notes

Bibliography
 2nd vol. of Life of William Blake, by Alexander Gilchrist, D. G. Rossetti, W. M. Rossetti, Anne Gilchrist (Chapter: Ideas of good and evil), 1863 & 1880.
 A. C. Swinburne. William Blake, a critical essay (Chapter: Lyrical poems), 1868.
 The Poems of William Blake, ed. by W. B. Yeats, 1893, rev. 1905.
 The poetical works of William Blake; a new and verbatim text from the manuscript engraved and letterpress originals; With variorum readings and bibliographical notes and prefaces, edited by Sampson, John, Clarendon Press Oxford, 1905.
 The Note-book of William Blake, ed. G. Keynes, 1935
 Blake Complete Writings, ed. G. Keynes, Nonesuch press 1957, OUP 1966/85
 The Complete Poetry & Prose of William Blake, ed. by David V. Erdman, Anchor Books, 1965/1982/1988 (see also at the Blake archive)
 Erdman, Errors in the 1973 edition of The Notebook . . ., Blake Newsletter, ix, 1975, pp. 39, 40
 G. E. Bentley Jr., Blake Books, Oxford, 1977, pp. 321–34 and passim.
 William Blake The Complete Poems, ed. Alicia Ostriker, Penguin Books 1977
 The Notebook of William Blake, ed. D. V. Erdman and D. K. Moore, New York, 1977
 M. L. Greenberg, "The Rossettis transcription of Blake's notebook", and "William Michael Rossetti's transcription and William Bell Scott's tracings from Blake's notebook", The Library, 6th ser., iv, 1982, pp. 249–72, and vi, 1984, pp. 254–76.

External links

 Add MS 49460.
 The Notebook of William Blake on the British Library's website showing 112 pages, with related articles and collection items

Art by William Blake
Poetry by William Blake
William Blake
British Library additional manuscripts